Supersonic Toothbrush Helmet is a Man or Astro-man? 7" EP released on Lance Rock Records in 1993.  The first pressing was available on clear red vinyl and on black vinyl.  The left inside of the record jacket features a black-and-white photo of an Astro Burger restaurant.  Later pressings were only pressed on black vinyl and the inside of the picture sleeve was left blank.

Track listing

Initial Bedtime Pillow Side
"Bermuda Triangle Shorts"
"The Vortex Beyond"

Cooler, Middle of the Night Switch Side
"Caffeine Trip"
"The Heavies" (The Ventures)

Line Up
Star Crunch - Guitar Flossing
Dr. Deleto and His Invisible Vaportron - Low Frequency Root Canals and Molar Removal
Birdstuff - Rhythmic Anti-Cavity Creep Propaganda
Coco the Electronic Monkey Wizard - Gingivitis and General Plaque Build Up

References

Man or Astro-man? EPs
1993 EPs